George Barrie (born 17 July 1904) was a Scottish professional footballer, who played as a defender for Crystal Palace and Gillingham between 1929 and 1937.

Career
Barrie signed for Crystal Palace from Kettering Town in June 1929. In March 1934, he moved to Gillingham having made 79 league appearances (83 in total) without scoring.

References

External links
Barrie at holmesdale.net

1904 births
Year of death missing
Scottish footballers
Gillingham F.C. players
Crystal Palace F.C. players
East Fife F.C. players
People from Glenrothes
Footballers from Fife
Association football defenders